The New Zealand national baseball team, also known as the Diamondblacks, is the representative team at the international level for New Zealand. The team is controlled by Baseball New Zealand, the country's governing body. The team competes in the Oceania Championship, where, in 2007, it withdrew from play, giving Australia an automatic berth into the Final qualification tournament for the 2008 Olympics. The "Diamondblacks" nickname is one of many national team nicknames related to the All Blacks.

Results and fixtures
The following is a list of professional baseball match results currently active in the latest version of the WBSC World Rankings, as well as any future matches that have been scheduled.

Legend

2022

2013 WBC Qualifiers 
In 2011, Major League Baseball announced that New Zealand would be among the nations invited to a new qualification round to be held in 2012 for the 2013 World Baseball Classic. Ryan Flynn, Chief Executive of Baseball New Zealand, called the development "the best thing to happen in the history of diamond sports in New Zealand." The Diamondblacks, managed by Andy Skeels, won two games and reached the championship game of the Qualifier, but fell to host Taiwan in the final game. New Zealand's Scott Campbell led all players in the tournament with a .583 batting average (7 for 12 with 2 doubles), while playing an error-free tournament at SS. Teammate Boss Moanaroa hit the tournament's only home run. Seventeen-year-old Mak Fox recorded the win against Thailand, while future Major Leaguer John Holdzkom was credited with the win against the Philippines.

2017 WBC Qualifiers 
The Diamondblacks, managed by Chris Woodward—a former Major League infielder and current Manager of the Texas Rangers—beat the Philippines but lost twice to South Africa and were eliminated. Boss Moanaroa led the way in New Zealand's win against the Philippines, going 4 for 5 with two doubles, a home run, and 7 RBI; he added another RBI against South Africa and thereby led the tournament with 8 RBI. His brother Moko led the team with a .500 batting average. Eighteen-year-old Jimmy Boyce was credited with the win against the Philippines. Five of the Diamondblacks were teenagers, including 17-year-old Kyle Glogoski, who also pitched against the Philippines.

2021 WBC Qualifiers 
New Zealand was set to compete in the 2021 World Baseball Classic Qualifiers. The Diamondblacks had named Stephen Mintz as their manager and had selected their roster. But the tournament was cancelled due to the COVID-19 pandemic.

Current roster

International tournament results

World Baseball Classic

References

National baseball teams
Baseball in New Zealand
Baseball